Paul W. Schroeder (February 23, 1927 – December 6, 2020) was an American historian who was professor emeritus at the University of Illinois. He specialized in European international politics from the late 16th to the 20th centuries, Central Europe, and the theory of history. He is known for his contributions to diplomatic history and international relations.

Biography
Schroeder was born in Cleveland, Ohio, the son of Rupert H. Schroeder and Elfrieda Koch. He attended Concordia Seminary (graduated 1951), Texas Christian University, and the University of Texas at Austin, where he received his doctorate in 1958. He received the 1956 Beveridge Award for the best manuscript on American history submitted by a beginning historian. He was an associate professor of history at Concordia Senior College from 1958 to 1963 and was later hired at the University of Illinois.

In the 1972 essay "World War I as a Galloping Gertie", against established historical opinion and Article 231 of the Treaty of Versailles, Schroeder laid the blame for the First World War on Britain's doorstep. Schroeder characterized the political events leading up to the war as a "Galloping Gertie," a metaphor that described political events as escalating out of control and pulling and pushing all five Great Powers into an unwanted war. Schroeder's research highlighted the fact that Britain was engaged in an “encirclement" policy directed at Austria-Hungary. The British policy was not in keeping with the Congress System, which had developed after the Napoleonic Wars, and was fundamentally anti-German and even more anti-Austrian. The policy created an atmosphere in which Germany was forced into a "preventive war" to maintain Austria as an allied power.

Apart from his scholarship, Schroeder was a regular contributor to the magazine The American Conservative and wrote strong critiques of the foreign policy of the George W. Bush administration, especially regarding the Iraq War, for its destabilizing counterproductive effects. The internationalist realist perspective of his critiques fit well with his favorable appraisals of the 19th-century Concert of Europe approach to international relations that he offered as a model in his scholarship. Perry Anderson called him "arguably the greatest living American historian" and said that his The Transformation of European Politics, 1763–1848 "revolutionised one of the most disgraced of all fields in the discipline,... diplomatic history."

References

Awards
 Albert J. Beveridge Award, American Historical Association, 1956
 Walter Prescott Webb Memorial Prize, 1962
 Finalist, Campus Award for Excellence in Undergraduate Teaching, University of Illinois, 1975
 Queen Prize, University of Illinois, 1980
 Senior University Scholar, University of Illinois, 1989
 British International Studies Association, 1990
 Jubilee Professor, University of Illinois, 1992
 Honorary Doctor of Letters, Valparaiso University, 1993

Fellowships
 Fulbright Scholar in Austria, 1956–1957
 United States Steel Foundation Fellow, 1957–1958
 Senior Fellow, National Endowment for the Humanities, 1973
 Senior Fellow, American Council of Learned Societies, 1976–1977
 Fellow, Woodrow Wilson International Center for Scholars, 1983–84
 Visiting Research Fellow, Merton College, Oxford, 1984
 Jennings Randolph Peace Fellow, United States Institute of Peace, 1992–93

Offices
 Secretary-Treasurer, Conference Group for Central European History, 1967–1968
 Research Division Committee, American Historical Association, 1974–1977
 Adams Prize Committee, American Historical Association, 1974–1977
 Member, Advisory Council, West European Program of the Woodrow Wilson International Center for Scholars, 1984–92.
 Member, American Committee to Promote the Study of the Habsburg Monarchy, 1983–88.
 Section editor, AHA Guide to Historical Literature.
 Member, Advisory Council, German Historical Institute Washington, 1995-.

Publications

Books
 The Axis Alliance and Japanese-American Relations, 1941 (Ithaca, N.Y.: Cornell University Press, 1958).
 Metternich's Diplomacy at Its Zenith, 1820–1823 (Austin, Texas: University of Texas press, 1962). Paperback reprint by University of Texas Press, 1976.
 Austria, Great Britain, and the Crimean War: The Destruction of the European Concert (Ithaca, N.Y.: Cornell University Press, 1972).
 The Transformation of European Politics, 1763–1848 (Oxford, Clarendon Press, 1994).
 Systems, Stability and Statecraft: Essays on the International History of Modern Europe (Palgrave Macmillan, 2004).

Articles
 "Metternich Studies since 1925," Journal of Modern History, 33, (Sept. 1961), 237-66. in JSTOR
 "Austrian Policy at the Congresses of Troppau and Laibach," Journal of Central European Affairs, 22#2 (July 1962), 139-52.
 "Austria as an Obstacle to Italian Unification and Freedom, 1814–1861," Austrian History Newsletter, 1962, 1-32.
 "American Books on Austria-Hungary," Austrian History Yearbook, II (1966), 1972-196.
 "The Status of Habsburg Studies in the United States," Austrian History Yearbook III. Pt. 3 (1967), 267-295.
 "Bruck versus Buol: The Dispute over Austrian Eastern Policy, 1853-1855," Journal of Modern History 40#2 (June 1968), 193-217. in JSTOR
 "Austria and the Danubian Principalities, 1853–1856," Central European History 2#3 (Sept. 1969), 216-36. in JSTOR
 "A Turning Point in Austrian Policy in the Crimean War: the Conferences of March, 1954," Austrian History Yearbook, IV-V (1968-1969), 159-202.
 "World War I as Galloping Gertie: A Reply to Joachim Remak," Journal of Modern History 44, No. 2, (Sept. 1972), 319-344. n JSTOR
 "The 'Balance of Power' System in Europe, 1815–1871," Naval War College Review, March–April 1975, 18-31.
 "Romania and the Great Powers before 1914," Revue Roumaine d'Histoire, XIV, 1 (1975), 39-53.
 "Munich and the British Tradition," The Historical Journal, 19, I (1976), pp. 223–243. in JSTOR
 "Alliances, 1815-1945: Weapons of Power and Tools of Management" in Klaus Knorr, ed., Historical Problems of National Security, (Lawrence, Kansas: Univ. of Kansas Press, 1976), pp. 247–286.
 "Quantitative Studies in the Balance of Power: An Historian's Reaction," and "A Final Rejoinder," Journal of Conflict Resolution 21#1 (March 1977), 3-22, 57-74. in JSTOR
 "Austro-German Relations: Divergent Views of the Disjoined Partnership," Central European History 11#3 (September 1978), 302-312.
 "Gladstone as Bismarck," Canadian Journal of History, XV (August 1980), pp. 163–195.
 "Containment Nineteenth Century Style: How Russia was Restrained," South Atlantic Quarterly, 82 (1983), 1-18.
 "The Lost Intermediaries: The Impact of 1870 on the European System," International History Review, VI (Feb. 1984), 1-27.
 "Oesterreich und die orientalische Frage, 1848–1883," in Das Zeitalter Kaiser Franz Josephs von der Revolution zur Gruenderzeit (Vienna, 1984), Vol. I, 324-28.
 "Does Murphy's Law Apply to History?", The Wilson Quarterly (New Year, 1985), 84-93.
 "The European International System, 1789–1848: Is There a Problem? an Answer?", colloquium paper presented March 19, 1984 at the Woodrow Wilson International Center for Scholars, Smithsonian Institution, Washington, D.C. (52 pp.).
 "The European International System, 1789–1848: Is There a Question? An Answer?", Proceedings of the Consortium on Revolutionary Europe (1985), 1-29.
 "The 19th-Century International System: Changes in the Structure," World Politics 39#1 (October 1986), 1-26. in JSTOR
 "Old Wine in Old Bottles: Recent Contributions to British Foreign Policy and European International Politics, 1789-1848," Journal of British Studies 26, 1 (January 1987), 1-25. in JSTOR
 "Once More, the German Question," International History Review IX, 1 (February 1987), 96-107.
 "The Collapse of the Second Coalition," Journal of Modern History 59, 2 (June 1987), pg. 244-290. in JSTOR
 "An Unnatural 'Natural Alliance': Castlereagh, Metternich, and Aberdeen in 1813," International History Review X, No. 4 (November 1988), 522–540.
 "The Nineteenth Century Balance of Power: Balance of Power or Political Equilibrium?", Review of International Studies (Oxford), 15 (April 1989), 135–153.
 "Failed Bargain Crises, Deterrence, and the International System," in Paul C. Stern et al., eds., Perspectives on Deterrence (New York: Oxford University Press, 1989), 67–83.
 "Germany and the Balance of Power: Past and Present Part I", in Wolf Gruner, ed., Gleichqewicht in Geschichte und Gegenwart (Hamburg: Kramer, 1989), 134–39.
 "Die Habsburger Monarchie und das europaische System im 19t. Jahrhundert," in A. M. Birke and G. Heydemann, eds. Die Herausforderung des europaischen Staatensystems (Göttingen: Vandenhoeck und Ruprecht, 1989). 178–82.
 "Europe and the German Confederation in the 1860s," in Helmut Rumpler, ed., Deutscher Bund und Deutsche Frage 1815-1866 (Vienna, 1990), 281–91.
 The Years 1848 and 1989: The Perils and Profits of Historical Comparisons," in Samuel F. Wells, ed., The Helsinki Process and the Future of Europe (Washington, DC, 1990), 15-21.
 "Review Article. Napoleon Bonaparte," International History Review, XII (May 1990), 324–29.
 "Napoleon's Foreign Policy: A Criminal Enterprise," Journal of Military History 54, No. 2 (April 1990), 147–61.in JSTOR
 "Die Rolle der Vereinigten Staaten bei der Entfesselung des Zweiten Weltkrieges," in Klaus Hildebrand et al., eds., 1939: An der Schwelle zum Weltkrieg (Berlin: de Gruyter, 1990), 215–19.
 "A Just, Unnecessary War: The Flawed American Strategy in the Persian Gulf." ACDIS Occasional Paper, March 1991. 14 pp.
 "The Neo-Realist Theory of International Politics: A Historian's View." ACDIS Occasional Paper, April, 1991. 12 pp.
 "Did the Vienna Settlement Rest on a Balance of Power?", American Historical Review, 97, 2 (June 1992), 683–706, 733-5. in JSTOR
 "The Transformation of Political Thinking, 1787-1848," in: Jack Snyder and Robert Jervis, eds., Coping with Complexity in the International System (Boulder: Westview Press, 1993), 47-70.
 "'System' and Systemic Thinking in International History," Journal of International History Review xv, 1 (February 1993), 116-34.
 "Economic Integration and the European International System in the Era of World War I," American Historical Review 94, 4 (October 1993), 1130–37. in JSTOR
 "Historical Reality vs Neo-Realist Theory," International Security 19, 1 (Summer 1994), pp. 108–48. in JSTOR
 "History vs. Neo-realism: A Second Look," International Security, Vol. 20, No. 1 (Summer, 1995), pp. 182–195 in JSTOR
 "History and International Relations Theory: Not Use or Abuse, but Fit or Misfit," International Security, Vol. 22, No. 1 (Summer, 1997), pp. 64–74 in JSTOR
 "The Transformation of European Politics. Some Reflections", in: Wolfram Pyta and Philipp Menger, eds., Das europäische Mächtekonzert. Friedens- und Sicherheitspolitik vomo Wiener Kongreß 1815 bis zum Krimkrieg 1853 (Köln: Boehlau, 2009), 25–41

External links
  Obituary: Paul W. Schroeder (Dec 11, 2020)
 In Memoriam Paul W. Schroeder (1927–2020) by Katherine Aaslestad
 The Importance of Paul Schroeder’s Scholarship to the Fields of International Relations and Diplomatic History at H-Diplo
 The Risks of Victory: An Historian's Provocation by Paul W. Schroeder
 A Papier-Maché Fortress by Paul W. Schroeder
 Articles at American Conservative
 Articles at JSTOR

1927 births
2020 deaths
Case Western Reserve University faculty
Historians of the United States
Texas Christian University alumni
University of Illinois Urbana-Champaign faculty
University of Texas alumni
Valparaiso University people
Writers from Cleveland
Concordia Seminary alumni
Fulbright alumni